He Guan (born 25 January 1993 in Tai'an) is a Chinese professional footballer who currently plays for Chinese Super League club Changchun Yatai on loan from Shanghai Port.

Club career
He started his professional football career in 2011 when he was loaned to Shanghai Zobon's squad for the 2011 China League Two campaign. He returned to Shanghai Dongya in 2013 and was promoted to first team squad in 2014. He made his senior debut on 16 July 2014 in the fourth round of 2014 Chinese FA Cup against Wuhan Hongxing. On 7 March 2015, He made his Chinese Super League debut in the season's opening game in a 2–1 win against Jiangsu Guoxin-Sainty. On 18 September 2016, He scored his first Chinese Super League goal in a 2–1 away victory against Hangzhou Greentown.

On 1 September 2022, He joined Chinese Super League club Changchun Yatai on loan. He made his Yatai debut on the same day in a 1–0 defeat against Chengdu Rongcheng at home.

International career
On 14 November 2017, He made his debut for the Chinese national team in a 4-0 international friendly defeat against Colombia.

Career statistics

Club statistics 
Statistics accurate as of match played 1 October 2022.

International statistics

Honours

Club
Shanghai SIPG
Chinese Super League: 2018
Chinese FA Super Cup: 2019

References

External links
 
 

1993 births
Living people
People from Tai'an
Chinese footballers
Footballers from Shandong
Pudong Zobon players
Shanghai Port F.C. players
China League Two players
Chinese Super League players
Association football defenders
China international footballers